Freeride is a discipline of mountain biking closely related to downhill biking, dirt jumping, freestyle motocross, and freestyle BMX. When riding a freerider one focuses on tricks, style, and technical trail features. Freeride is now recognized as one of the most popular disciplines within mountain biking.

The term freeriding was originally coined by snowboarders, meaning riding without a set course, goals or rules on natural terrain. In mountain biking, it is riding trail with the most creative line possible that includes style, amplitude, control, and speed. Many in the cycling industry suggest that the Laguna Rads were the first to freeride, that is riding terrain that didn't already have an existing path or network of trails.

History

The original freeride bikes were modified downhill bikes that utilized gearing that enabled the rider to go up hills as well as down them. Modern freeride bikes are similar to downhill bikes, but feature slightly less suspension travel and are lighter – which enables them to be ridden not just downhill but through more technical sections, such as North Shore obstacles. Most freeride bikes feature slightly steeper headangles and shorter wheelbases than pure downhill bikes. Although a minimal difference, it is done to help with maneuverability and spin tricks. Ski areas have started to embrace the sport of freeriding, adding bike racks to chairlifts to create "lift accessed mountain biking". This helps ski areas operate year-round and gives the bikers the ability to ride more runs in less time.

Notable riders
A few specialist riders have embraced the sport including:

Fabio Wibmer 
Ryan Nyquist
Darren Berrecloth
Brandon Semenuk
Brett Rheeder
Kelly McGarry
Gee Atherton
Cameron Zink
Robbie Bourdon
Ethen Roberts
Emil Johansson
Sam Reynolds
Jeff Lenosky
Kurt Sorge
Martin Söderström
Andreu Lacondeguy
Graham Aggasiz
Hans Rey
Nicholi Rogatkin
Sam Pilgrim
Wade Simmons
Dave Watson
Anthony Messere
Andrew Shandro
Cédric Gracia 
Matt Hunter 
Max Fredriksson
Bienvenido Aguado

Differences between downhilling and freeriding

Due to similarities with the bicycles used and often the riding locations, the divisions between downhill riding and freeriding are often overlooked. For example, freeride bikes have steeper head tube angles and shorter wheelbases for low-speed stability on technical stunts, while downhill bikes have slacker headtube angles and longer wheelbases for absolute high-speed stability at the cost of low-speed maneuverability. Downhill riding is primarily concerned with descending a slope on a given course as quickly as possible. There are often many obstacles in downhill riding, including jumps, drops, and rocky sections.

Freeride is, by definition, a much broader realm of riding. For example, a freerider may often ride a very narrow wooden plank raised as many as twenty five feet above the ground, drop off of cliffs, raised platforms, or other man-made or natural objects onto a landing, or "transition" up to forty feet below. This may involve jumping over a structure below, such as a road or highway.  Many aspects of freeriding are similar to downhill riding, with wide open speed and technical and very steep sections, or dirt jumping, with a series of man-made jumps and landings. Another key difference is the emphasis on performing tricks or stylish riding stances while airborne.  A freeride course can be compared to a skatepark, where the purpose of the trail is to provide ample opportunities for the rider to become airborne, throw tricks, and create new and imaginative lines on and over the terrain.

Main features of freeride bikes

Frame
The frame is made usually of aluminium alloys and/or steel, and usually smaller build compared to a downhill bike. It is also equipped with rear suspension systems, and many manufacturers still rely on simpler systems (i.e. single-pivot) in order to preserve strength and uninterrupted suspension travel. Freeride frames can also be lighter (where weight is an important consideration) than downhill frames, with these bikes being designated freeride lite and may come equipped with the new, oversized "onepointfive" (inch) head tube standard, in order to cater for increasing demand for stronger, long-travel(150–200 mm), single crown forks. There also exists a burlier breed of freeride bicycles. These bikes were originally designed for weight-no-object strength and reliability rather than lighter weight. However, in recent years, due to the emergence of new forging techniques for aluminum and the introduction of carbon fiber as a viable construction material, these frames have become considerably lighter than earlier generations, sometimes comparable to the weight of normal bicycles.

Fork
Single crown forks are now more popular. Companies such as Fox, Answer Products (Manitou), Marzocchi and RockShox, introduced them with very similar strength to their dual crown counterparts, with the immense advantage of being a single crown. This enables a significantly narrower steering diameter, and, more recently, airborne tricks such as 'barspin' or 'tailwhip', at the expense of torsional rigidity. This enables the bike to be used in a variety of ways.

Gearing
Freeride mountain bikes are often geared differently to downhill or other mountain bikes. There are three main types of freeride mountain bike gearings, these are single speed, short range and long range. Single speed mountain bikes use a single chainring at the front, mounted to the cranks, and a single sprocket at the rear, normally mounted to a freewheel or a freehub. A short range freeride bike uses a single chainring at the front, with a cassette hub, containing multiple (usually 7 to 10) sprockets, ranging in size from 10 teeth to 36 teeth. A long range freeride bike normally has a single chainring at the front (however older bikes may have 2 or 3) with multiple (10, 11 or 12) sprockets at the rear mounted on a cassette hub, ranging in size from 10-52 teeth. The larger number of gears and larger rear rings provide a "low low gear" for climbing up steep surfaces.

Notable competitions

There are many competitions in the discipline of freeride mountain biking that take place around the globe, similar to downhill mountain biking. The most popular competitions include Red Bull Rampage, Red Bull Crankworx and Red Bull Joyride, all of which take place once a year.

X-Games had slopestyle mountain bike event introduced and debut in X-Games Munich 2013. The sport has not been able to follow up with X-Games since despite its popularity and growth over the years. This is partially due to the poorly executed event which had a poorly designed course. Along with bad wind conditions and constant rain throughout the weekend. Due to the conditions and sketchy course many riders chose not to ride and in the finals only consisted of 6 riders. Athlete Martin Soderstrom would be the only European rider who dropped on his run he later quoted saying “I would say that we pretty much had all the bad luck we could get for our first X-games with the rain and wind and a course that was really hard to trick.”

X-Games legend Cam Zink competed finals with a separated shoulder. He later was quoted on ESPN saying “Who cares if the course sucks? Sack up and ride!”

Crankworx Is a series of slopestyle events that take place in FMB the world tour. Red Bull Joyride, which has been called the “Super Bowl” of the sport takes place in Whistler Canada.

Red Bull District Ride is a street style contest that goes throughout the streets of a city and later into the final massive jump.

The North Shore

The sport has spread across the planet, but the widely recognized starting point for the addition of man-made obstacles for downhill trails is Vancouver, British Columbia's "North Shore". This refers to three mountains across the Burrard Inlet from downtown Vancouver, Mount Seymour, Mt. Fromme, and Cypress Mountain.

The mountains weren't the first places to have downhill trails with natural obstacles, but they were one of the first places to have man-made obstacles such as skinny bridges and teeter totters. The trail builders often integrate many natural features, using fallen logs to ride on and rocks faces to jump or ride down.

Trails on the North Shore are mostly described as "technical". This means that the trails corners are tight and the tread strewn with natural obstacles such as rocks and roots.

Advocacy
The "shore" has seen some controversy. Most of the trails are built on private property or parkland. BC Parks has responded to growing popularity of freeriding with increased enforcement against illegal trail building and usage. A major voice in the conflict in North Vancouver District was Councillor Ernie Crist, who had been lobbying for the closing of all the trails on Mt. Fromme. Housing developments at the base of the mountains complain of bikers going across their lawns, etc. The expansion of the residential areas called for the destruction of some trails on Cypress Mountain. There were also cases of sabotage (such as the removal of bridge supports). Most recently, Howell at the Moon Productions partnered with IMBA to create "Pedal-Driven: a bikeumentary", a documentary film highlighting the conflicts and confrontations between freeriders and public land managers over the right to build trails and ride on public lands.

North Shore Mountain Biking Association
To help promote biking and keep the trails open there is an advocacy group, the North Shore Mountain Biking Association (NSMBA). They negotiate with landowners, organize volunteers to maintain the trails and hold races. The NSMBA 101 document explains the organizations involvement.

Freeriding in film
 
Freeride mountain-biking movies are films about freeride mountain-biking and downhill mountain biking. Scenes from freeride competitions are normally included. Given the high spectacularity of the freeride and downhill action, an increasing number of films are released every year, covering the annual major competitions and promoting particular trails and champions. The Film "Where the Trail Ends" and the YouTube series "Life Behind Bars" are very good examples of freeriding.

See also
Mountain bike
Mountain biking
Lift accessed mountain biking

References

External links
 BRMBA - Black Rock Mountain Biking Association (Oregon trail advocacy group and builders/stewards of the Black Rock freeride trails in Falls City, Oregon)
 Pinkbike.com - Website featuring news, pictures, forums, videos etc. of all mountain biking disciplines, particularly the extreme ones
 Black Rock Mountain Biking  - Produced by Oregon Public Broadcasting

Mountain biking